Adela paludicolella is a moth of the family Adelidae. It is found in Italy, Greece and on Corsica, Sardinia, Crete and Cyprus.

References

Adelidae
Moths described in 1850
Moths of Europe
Taxa named by Philipp Christoph Zeller